Ayana Gempei is a Japanese freestyle wrestler. She won one of the bronze medals in the 65 kg event at the 2018 World Wrestling Championships held in Budapest, Hungary.

Career 

At the 2017 Asian Wrestling Championships held in New Delhi, India, she won the silver medal in the 63 kg event. At the 2018 World U23 Wrestling Championship held in Bucharest, Romania, she won the gold medal in the 65 kg event. In 2018, she also competed in the 68 kg event at the Asian Games without winning a medal; she lost her bronze medal match against Meerim Zhumanazarova of Kyrgyzstan.

Major results

References

External links 
 

Living people
Year of birth missing (living people)
Place of birth missing (living people)
Japanese female sport wrestlers
World Wrestling Championships medalists
Wrestlers at the 2018 Asian Games
Asian Games competitors for Japan
21st-century Japanese women